Ondi Doane Timoner is an American filmmaker and the founder and chief executive officer of Interloper Films, a full-service production company located in Pasadena, California. Timoner is a two-time recipient of the Sundance Film Festival's Grand Jury Prize for her documentaries Dig! (2004) and We Live in Public (2009). Both films have been acquired by New York's Museum of Modern Art for their permanent collection.

Timoner is a member of the Academy of Motion Picture Arts & Sciences, the DGA, the PGA, the International Documentary Association, Film Fatales, and Women in Film. Ondi Timoner's The New Americans: Gaming a Revolution explores democracy with cheat codes.

Early life
Timoner was born in Miami, Florida to Elissa and Eli Timoner, co-founder of Air Florida. She has two siblings, Rabbi Rachel Timoner and David Timoner, who co-founded Interloper Films and has collaborated on several of her works.

Timoner attended Yale University, where she founded the Yale Street Theater Troupe, a guerrilla theater ensemble that performed spontaneously in unexpected environments, in 1992. She made her directorial stage debut in 1993 with her production of Sarah Daniels' Masterpieces. Timoner shot her first documentary film, Three Thousand Miles and a Woman with a Video Camera, with her younger brother David and John Krokidas, interviewing people at crossroads and convenience stores while on a cross country road trip.

She subsequently filmed Reflections on a Moment: The Sixties and the Nineties, an exploration of her generation's nostalgia for the 1960s and The Purple Horizon, a 60-minute documentary on the March on Washington for Lesbian, Gay and Bi Equal Rights and Liberation. For her film Voices From Inside Time she interviewed women inmates which would eventually lead her to Bonnie Jean Foreshaw, the subject of her first feature film, The Nature Of The Beast. The film went on to win the Howard Lamar Film Prize for Best Undergraduate Film at Yale University.

Timoner graduated cum laude from Yale in 1994, where she majored in American Studies, with a concentration in Film and Literature and Theater Studies.

Career 
Her first feature documentary, The Nature Of The Beast (1994), centered around the life and case of Bonnie Jean Foreshaw (a woman serving the longest prison sentence in the state of Connecticut for incidentally killing a pregnant woman while defending herself against a man) in order to shine light on the racism and systemic holes in our justice system.

She also worked on PBS documentaries while interning for documentary filmmaker Helen Whitney.

Additionally, Timoner has worked as an Assistant Producer for NBC Media Services and Assistant Regional Coordinator for the Steven Spielberg Holocaust/Oral History Project in Miami, Florida.

2000s 
Timoner created, executive produced and directed the VH1 original series SOUND AFFECTS (2000), a film about music's effect at critical moments in people's lives.

Timoner directed, co-produced, and edited DIG! (2004) with her brother David Timoner, which chronicles seven years in the lives of two neo-psychedelic bands, The Dandy Warhols and The Brian Jonestown Massacre. The film explores the love-hate relationship of the band's frontmen, Courtney Taylor and Anton Newcombe. The film won the Grand Jury Prize at the Sundance Film Festival in 2004, is now part of the permanent collection of the Museum of Modern Art in New York City, and was screened as the finale of the Film Society at Lincoln Center and MoMA's 33rd annual New Directors/New Films Festival, in 2004.

Timoner co-directed the short film Recycle (2005), a documentary about a homeless man who makes a garden in downtown Los Angeles. The film premiered at the Sundance Film Festival in 2005 and also played at the Cannes Film Festival.

Her third feature documentary, Join Us (2007), follows families in their escape from a cult. It premiered at LA Film Festival, winning awards at the Sidewalk Film Festival and the Vancouver International Film Festival.

When the Jonas Brothers were signed to Columbia Records, Timoner was hired to film three music videos for the group.

Timoner debuted We Live in Public (2009) at the Sundance Film Festival. The film focuses on Josh Harris, an American internet entrepreneur who founded Pseudo.com, a webcasting website that filed for bankruptcy in 1993.

We Live in Public won the Grand Jury Prize award in the Documentary category at the Sundance Film Festival and a Special Jury Mention for 'Best Documentary Film Over 30 Minutes Long' at the 2009 Karlovy Vary International Film Festival.

2010s 
Timoner was hired by Ralph Winter and Terry Botwick to make her fifth feature, Cool it (2010), adapted from the 2007 book of the same name following controversial political scientist Bjørn Lomborg. The film premiered at Toronto International Film Festival and was distributed theatrically by Roadside Attractions.

Her next film, Library of Dust (2011), shines light on canisters of cremated remains found at the Oregon State Hospital. Co-directed with Robert James, Library of Dust premiered at SXSW in 2011 and went on to win The Grand Jury Prize at five festivals, including Seattle International Film Festival, Taos Film Festival, Traverse City Film Festival, and International Film Festival of Puerto Rico.

The Last Mile (2015), made with Conde Nast, focuses on a tech incubator inside San Quentin Prison.

Timoner's sixth feature documentary, Brand: A Second Coming (2015), about the journey of comedian/author/activist Russell Brand, was chosen to be the opening night film at the 2015 SXSW Film Festival in Austin, Texas and was later picked up by Showtime. She was the sixth and final director to work on the film, Albert Maysles being one of the predecessors.

Timoner was invited by real estate entrepreneur Jimmy Stice to visit his for-profit sustainability program, Kalu Yala, in the Panamanian Jungle. Timoner filmed her next project around the business venture in 2016. Spike Jonze picked up the project for Viceland and the footage was released as the ten-hour docu-series Jungletown (2017).

Timoner debuted her narrative feature Mapplethorpe (2018), titled The Perfect Moment in pre-production, at the 2018 Tribeca Film Festival, where it was nominated for Best Narrative Feature. It is based on the life and career of the controversial portrait photographer Robert Mapplethorpe, starring Matt Smith as the titular artist. The project received a grant through the Tribeca Film Institute's 9th annual All Access Program and was invited to participate in the Sundance Institute Director's, Writer's and Producer's Labs - receiving an Adrienne Shelley Grant. It was later picked up by Samuel Goldwyn Films in July 2018 and had its theatrical release on March 1, 2019. The Director's Cut, which was selected to premiere at Sundance but ultimately did not screen there, was released April 2, 2021.

2020s 

In 2020, Ondi Timoner directed Coming Clean, a feature documentary about addiction through the eyes of recovering addicts and political leaders. The film premiered at the Bentonville Film Festival on August 6, 2020 and won the Impact Award at the Naples International Film Festival 2020 and Special Jury Prize for Editing at Sidewalk Film Festival 2020.

Timoner's latest feature, Last Flight Home, tells the story of her father, Eli Timoner, who passed away during the film's production. The film premiered in the Special Screening category at Sundance Film Festival in 2022, and was purchased by MTV Documentary Films shortly after.  The film was shortlisted for the 2023 Academy Awards.

Ondi is currently directing a documentary about the disruption of finance.

Other works
Timoner founded, directed and produced A Total Disruption (2012). Her short film Obey the artist, about graphic artist Shepard Fairey, world-premiered at the SXSW Film Festival in 2013. Timoner's short film, Amanda Palmer f---ing rocks, about maverick musician Amanda Palmer world premiered in 2014 at the TriBeCa Film Festival and played festivals worldwide, winning the Sheffield Shorts Award at the Sheffield International Documentary Festival.

Personal life
Timoner is the daughter of Eli Timoner, founder of Air Florida. She has two siblings. Timoner has one son, Joaquim Timoner, born in 2003. Timoner is a Democrat.

Select awards and recognition
In 1999, Ondi was Grammy-nominated for Best Long Form Music Video for an EPK she directed about the band Fastball.

 2004 — Grand Jury Prize at Sundance Film Festival for Dig! 
 2004 — Best Director Jury Prize at BendFilm Festival for Dig!
 2007 — Special Jury Prize at the Sidewalk Film Festival for Join Us
 2007 — Grand Jury Prize for Documentary Short at Seattle International Film Festival for Library of Dust
 2009 — Grand Jury Prize at Sundance Film Festival for We Live in Public
 2015 — No Limits Award at the Ashland Independent Film Festival for Brand: A Second Coming
 2015 — Dramatic Storytelling Award at the Sarasota Film Festival for Brand: A Second Coming 
 2012 — Ashland Independent Film Festival's Rogue Award
 2014 — Sheffield Short Doc Award at the Sheffield International Documentary Festival for Amanda F---ing Palmer on the Rocks
 2017 — Kodak Auteur Award
 2018 — Audience Awards at Sidewalk Film Festival for Mapplethorpe
 2018 — Audience Awards at Tribeca Film Festival for Mapplethorpe
 2018 — Best Director at Long Beach International Film Festival for Mapplethorpe
 2020 — Impact Award at the Naples International Film Festival 2020 for Coming Clean
 2020 — Special Jury Prize for Editing at Sidewalk Film Festival 2020 for Coming Clean
 2022 — Special Screenings selection at Sundance Film Festival

Further reading
 Interview: Alexandra Alter, 2009, "'The Truman Show' for Everyone: A documentary filmmaker and her now-reluctant subject on living in public ['We Live in Public']," at The Wall Street Journal (online): Arts & Entertainment, "Just Asking," April 4, 2009
 Interview: Dina Gachman, 2013, "Are Entrepreneurs the Rock Stars of Today?", at ForbesWoman, January 10, 2013.
 Interview: Kevin Ritchie, 2013, "Hot Docs '13: Ondi Timoner talks art and entrepreneurship [and the "A Total Disruption" endeavor]," at RealScreen.
 TED Talk: Ondi Timoner, 2014, When genius and insanity hold hands
Interview: Steve Appleford, 2014, LA TIMES: As technology explodes, A Total Disruption is there to record it.
Interview: Joanna Pocock, 2016, 3:AM Magazine: My Afternoon with Ondi.
Interview: Laurie Brookins, 2019, The Hollywood Reporter: Mapplethorpe Exhibition Opens at Guggenheim Ahead of Upcoming Biopic.
Interview: Naomi Fry, 2019, The New Yorker: From H.R.H. to S & M.
Review: Gary Goldstein, 2019, The LA Times: Review: 'Mapplethorpe's' Matt Smith skillfully evokes the boundary-pushing photographer
Review: Elizabeth Weitzman, 2022, The Wrap "Last Flight Home" Film Review: Ondi Timoner's Beautiful Tribute to Her Father Documents His Last Days
Article: Bret Lang, 2022, Variety MTV Documentary Films Buys "Last Flight Home" Out of Sundance, Plans Awards Push (Exclusive)
Article: Addie Morfoot, 2022, Ondi Timoner Is Ready to Take "Flight" at Sundance With Her Most Personal Doc Yet (Exclusive Clip)

Select filmography

Feature Film 
Dig! (2004)
Join Us (2007)
We Live in Public (2009)
Cool It (2010)
Brand: A Second Coming (2015)
Mapplethorpe (2018)
Coming Clean (2020)
Mapplethorpe: The Director's Cut (2021)
Last Flight Home (2022)

Short Film 
 Recycle (2004)
 Library of Dust (2011)
 Amanda F***ing Palmer On The Rocks (2014)
 Russell Brand's The Birds (2014)
 Obey the Artist (2014)
 The Last Mile (2015)
 3000 Miles and Woman with a Video Camera

Television 
The Nature Of The Beast (TV, 1994)
Sound Affects (TV, 2000)
Jungletown (TV, 2017)

See also 

 List of female film and television directors
 List of LGBT-related films directed by women

References

External links
 Interloper Films
 A Total Disruption
 Interview in the Seattle Post-Intelligencer
 Interview on SuicideGirls
 Filmmaker Profile on Snagfilms
 

Living people
American documentary filmmakers
American film directors
Yale University alumni
American women documentary filmmakers
21st-century American women
Year of birth missing (living people)